This list of constructed scripts is in alphabetical order. ISO 15924 codes are provided where assigned. This list includes neither shorthand systems nor ciphers of existing scripts.

{| class="wikitable sortable" 
|-
!style=width:8.6em|Script name !! ISO 15924 !!data-sort-type=text|Year created !! Creator !! Comments (click to sort by category)
|-
| Adlam || Adlm || 1989 ||Ibrahima & Abdoulaye Barry ||data-sort-value=￮0natural￮0alphabet￮1989|Proposed alphabet used to write the Fula language
|-
| Afaka || Afak || 1910 ||Afáka Atumisi||data-sort-value=￮0natural￮2syllabary￮1910|Syllabary used to write the Ndyuka language, an English-based creole of Surinam
|-
|Aiha||data-sort-value=Zzzz| || 1985 || Ursula K. Le Guin ||data-sort-value=￮1fiction￮0novel￮1985LeGuin|Alphabet of the fictional Kesh language in her novel Always Coming Home
|-
|Ariyaka || ||  || Mongkut || Invented to transcrib Pali, the liturgical language of Theravada Buddhism, and inspired by the Greek and Burmese-Mon scripts
|-
| Armenian || Armn ||data-sort-value=0405|ca. 405 || Mesrop Mashtots ||data-sort-value=￮0natural￮0alphabet￮0boGreek￮0405|Alphabet thought to have been based on Greek used to write Armenian
|-
|Ath||data-sort-value=Zzzz| ||1996||Hiroyuki Morioka||data-sort-value=￮1fiction￮0novel￮1996|Alphabet of the fictional Baronh language in his novel Crest of the Stars
|-
| aUI ||data-sort-value=Zzzz| ||1962|| John W. Weilgart ||data-sort-value=￮￮misc￮1962|Language and alphabet attempting to unify sound and meaning
|-
| Aurebesh ||data-sort-value=Zzzz| ||1993 ||Stephen Crane||data-sort-value=￮1fiction￮2tvfilm￮1993|Alphabet originally for Star Wars Miniatures Battles Companion based on glyphs by Joe Johnston, subsequently used for other media in the franchise
|-
| Avoiuli ||data-sort-value=Zzzz| || 1990s || Viraleo Boborenvanua ||data-sort-value=￮0natural￮0alphabet￮1990s|Alphabet used by the Turaga indigenous movement for some languages in Vanuatu
|-
|Bagam||data-sort-value=Zzzz| ||data-sort-value=1900|ca. 1900||King Pufong||data-sort-value=￮0natural￮3logographic￮1900|Largely lost logosyllabic script used for letters and records in the Mengaka language
|-
|Bamum||Bamu||data-sort-value=1910|1896–1910||Ibrahim Njoya||data-sort-value=￮0natural￮2syllabary￮1910|Syllabary for Bamum developed from what initially was a pictographic system
|-
|Bharati Script
|
|2016-*
|Prof. V. Srinivasa Chakravarthy and others
|Alternative common script of major Indian languages (both Indo-Aryan and Dravidian) to facilitate easy communication
|-
| Blissymbol || Blis || 1949 || Charles K. Bliss ||data-sort-value=￮￮misc￮1949|Conceived as a non-spoken (soundless), purely ideographic script
|-
|Bopomofo||Bopo||1913||Zhang Binglin||data-sort-value=￮0natural￮0alphabet￮1913|Semisyllabary to transcribe spoken Mandarin, Holo, &c., mainly for teaching
|-
| Braille || Brai|| 1821 || Louis Braille ||data-sort-value=￮￮misc￮1821|Tactile alphabet for the blind using embossed dots; dozens of derived scripts
|-
| Canadian Aboriginal syllabics || Cans || 1840s || James Evans ||data-sort-value=￮0natural￮1abugida￮1840|Family of abugidas used to write a number of Aboriginal Canadian languages of the Algonquian, Inuit, and (formerly) Athabaskan language families
|-
|Caucasian Albanian||Aghb||data-sort-value=0408|ca. 408||Mesrop Mashtots||data-sort-value=￮0natural￮0alphabet￮0boGreek￮0408|Alphabet used to write the now extinct Caucasian Albanian language
|-
| Cherokee || Cher || 1819 || Sequoyah ||data-sort-value=￮0natural￮2syllabary￮1819|Syllabary inspired by Latin glyph shapes used to write the Cherokee language
|-
| Chữ Việt Trí ||data-sort-value=Zzzz| || 2012 || Tôn Thất Chương ||data-sort-value=￮0natural￮0alphabet￮￮Vietnamese￮2012|Alphabet designed for the Vietnamese language
|-
| Cirth || Cirt ||1930s|| J. R. R. Tolkien ||data-sort-value=￮1fiction￮0novel￮1910Tolkien￮2|Runic elven script, mainly for dwarven writing in his novel The Lord of the Rings
|-
| Clear Script ||data-sort-value=Zzzz| || 1648 || Zaya Pandit ||data-sort-value=￮0natural￮0alphabet￮1648|Alphabet used to write the Oirat language; based on Mongolian script
|-
| Coorgi-Cox ||data-sort-value=Zzzz| || 2005 || Gregg M. Cox ||data-sort-value=￮0natural￮1abugida￮2005|A proposed abugida for the Kodava language
|-
| Cyrillic || Cyrl / Cyrs ||data-sort-value=0940|ca. 940 || Saint Cyril or his students||data-sort-value=￮0natural￮0alphabet￮0boGreek￮0940|Alphabet mainly used to write Slavic languages; based primarily on Greek
|-
| Deseret || Dsrt ||data-sort-value=1868|mid-19th century || University of Deseret ||data-sort-value=￮0natural￮0alphabet￮￮English￮1868|A phonemic alphabet designed for the English language
|-
|data-sort-value=Dni|D'ni||data-sort-value=Zzzz| ||1997||Richard A. Watson||data-sort-value=￮1fiction￮1game￮1997|Alphabet for the fictional language in the game Riven and its sequels
|-
|Duployan shorthand||Dupl||1891||Jean-Marie Le Jeune||data-sort-value=￮0natural￮0alphabet￮1891|Historically used as the main (non-shorthand) script for Chinook Jargon
|-
|Elbasan||Elba||1761||data-sort-value=zzd|disputed||data-sort-value=￮0natural￮0alphabet￮1761|Alphabet for Albanian used to write the Elbasan Gospel Manuscript
|-
| Engsvanyáli ||data-sort-value=Zzzz| || 1940s || M. A. R. Barker ||data-sort-value=￮1fiction￮1game￮1940|Abugida used in the Empire of the Petal Throne role-playing game
|- 
| Eskayan ||data-sort-value=Zzzz| ||data-sort-value=1928|ca. 1920–1937||Mariano Datahan||data-sort-value=￮0natural￮2syllabary￮1928|Syllabary based on cursive Latin script for the auxiliary Eskayan language
|-
| Extensions to the IPA (extIPA) || Latn || 1990–*|| International ClinicalPhonetics and Linguistics Association || data-sort-value=￮￮misc￮1990 |A set of letters and diacritics to augment the International Phonetic Alphabet for the phonetic transcription of disordered speech
|-
| Fraser ||Lisu|| 1915 ||Sara Ba Thaw||data-sort-value=￮0natural￮0alphabet￮1915|Alphabet used to write the Lisu language; improved by James O. Fraser 
|-
| Gargish ||data-sort-value=Zzzz| || 1990 || Herman Miller ||data-sort-value=￮1fiction￮1game￮1990|Alphabet for the fictional Gargish language in Ultima VI: The False Prophet
|-
| Glagolitic || Glag ||data-sort-value=0862| 862–863 || Saints Cyril and Methodius ||data-sort-value=￮0natural￮0alphabet￮0boGreek￮0862|Historically used to write Slavic languages, before Cyrillic became dominant
|-
|Gothic||Goth||data-sort-value=0350|ca. 350||Ulfilas||data-sort-value=￮0natural￮0alphabet￮0boGreek￮0350|Alphabet based primarily on Greek historically used to write the Gothic language
|-
| HamNoSys ||data-sort-value=Zzzz| || 1985 ||University of Hamburg||data-sort-value=￮￮misc￮1985|General phonetic transcription system for all sign languages
|-
| Hangul || Hang || 1443 ||data-sort-value=Sejong|Court of Sejong the Great ||data-sort-value=￮0natural￮0alphabet￮1443|Alphabet written in syllable blocks used to write the Korean language; the oldest and most widespread featural script in use
|-
|iConji||data-sort-value=Zzzz| ||2010||Kai Staats||data-sort-value=￮￮misc￮2010|Pictographic writing system for messenging
|-
| International Phonetic Alphabet (IPA) || Latn || 1888–* || International Phonetic Association ||data-sort-value=￮￮misc￮1888|Regarded as being an extension of the Latin script
|-
| Ithkuil||data-sort-value=Zzzz| ||2004||John Quijada||data-sort-value=￮￮misc￮2004|Script for the constructed Ithkuil language
|-
|Jurchen||Jurc||data-sort-value=1119|ca. 1119||Wanyan Xiyin||data-sort-value=￮0natural￮3logographic￮1119|Largely undeciphered logographic script with phonetic elements for Jurchen
|-
| data-sort-value=Kelen|Kēlen ||data-sort-value=Zzzz| || 1980 || Sylvia Sotomayor ||data-sort-value=￮￮misc￮1980|Alphabet for a fictional alien language without verbs
|-
|Khitan large script||Kitl||data-sort-value=0920|920||data-sort-value=Abaoji|by order of Abaoji||data-sort-value=￮0natural￮3logographic￮0920|
Largely undeciphered logographic script for the Khitan language
|-
|Khitan small script||Kits||data-sort-value=0924|ca. 924||Yelü Diela||data-sort-value=￮0natural￮3logographic￮0924|Partially deciphered logographic script with phonetic elements for Khitan
|-
|Khom||data-sort-value=Zzzz| ||1924||Ong Kommandam||data-sort-value=￮0natural￮2syllabary￮1924|Semi-syllabary used for secret communication among dissidents in French Laos
|-
|Kikakui||Mend||data-sort-value=1917|ca. 1917||Mohammed Turay||data-sort-value=￮0natural￮2syllabary￮1917|Syllabary used to write the Mende language of Sierra Leone
|-
| KLI pIqaD || Piqd ||data-sort-value=1990|ca. 1990||data-sort-value=zza|anonymous||data-sort-value=￮1fiction￮2tvfilm￮1990|Glyphs created for Star Trek: The Next Generation, later sent as a font to the KLI
|-
|Limbu||Limb||data-sort-value=1740|ca. 1740||Te-ongsi Sirijunga Xin Thebe||data-sort-value=￮0natural￮1abugida￮1740|Abugida derived from Tibetan to write the Limbu language
|-
| Lisu syllabary ||data-sort-value=Zzzz| || 1924–1930 ||Ngua-ze-bo||data-sort-value=￮0natural￮2syllabary￮1924|Syllabary of about 800 characters used to write the Lisu language
|-
|Manchu||data-sort-value=Zzzz| ||data-sort-value=1632|1599; 1632||Nurhaci; Dahai||data-sort-value=￮0natural￮0alphabet￮1632|Alphabet based on Mongolian script to write the nearly extinct Manchu language
|-
|Mandombe||data-sort-value=Zzzz| ||1978||Wabeladio Payi||data-sort-value=￮0natural￮0alphabet￮1978|Alphabet written in syllable blocks for Kikongo, Lingala, Ciluba and Kiswahili
|-
|Miꞌkmaw hieroglyphic writing||data-sort-value=Zzzz| ||data-sort-value=1675|after 1675||Chrestien Le Clercq||data-sort-value=￮0natural￮3logographic￮1675|Logographic script used historically for the Miꞌkmaq language
|-
| Night writing ||data-sort-value=Zzzz| || 1808|| Charles Barbier ||data-sort-value=￮￮misc￮1808|Forerunner of Braille; tactile alphabet intended for communication in total darkness
|-
| data-sort-value=NKo|N'Ko || Nkoo || 1949 || Solomana Kante ||data-sort-value=￮0natural￮0alphabet￮1949|Alphabet used to write the Manding languages, including a kind of koine
|-
|Ol Chiki||Olck||1925||Raghunath Murmu||data-sort-value=￮0natural￮0alphabet￮1925|Official alphabet for the Santali language
|-
|Old Permic||Perm||1372||Stephen of Perm||data-sort-value=￮0natural￮0alphabet￮0boGreek￮1372|Alphabet mainly based on Cyrillic and Greek once used to write mediaeval Komi
|-
| Phags-pa || Phag || 1269 || Drogön Chögyal Phagpa ||data-sort-value=￮0natural￮0alphabet￮1269|Used historically for the languages in the Yuan sector of the Mongolian Empire
|-
| Pollard || Plrd || 1936 || Sam Pollard ||data-sort-value=￮0natural￮1abugida￮1936|Abugida based on Cree used to write several minority languages in China
|-
| Quikscript ||data-sort-value=Zzzz| || 1966 || Ronald Kingsley Read ||data-sort-value=￮0natural￮0alphabet￮￮English￮1966|Phonemic alphabet designed to write the English language quickly and compactly
|-
| Sarati || Sara || 1910s || J. R. R. Tolkien ||data-sort-value=￮1fiction￮0novel￮1910Tolkien￮0|Precursor of his elven Tengwar script
|-
| Shavian || Shaw ||data-sort-value=1961|ca. 1960 || Ronald Kingsley Read ||data-sort-value=￮0natural￮0alphabet￮￮English￮1961|Phonemic alphabet to write the English language; precursor to Quikscript
|-
| SignWriting || Sgnw || 1974 ||Valerie Sutton||data-sort-value=￮￮misc￮1974|Proposed phonemic system of writing sign languages
|-
| sitelen pona ||data-sort-value=Zzzz| || 2012 || Sonja Lang ||data-sort-value=￮￮misc￮2012|Logographic writing system used in Toki Pona
|-
| Soyombo ||Soyo|| 1686 || Zanabazar ||data-sort-value=￮0natural￮1abugida￮1686|Abugida historically used to write the Mongolian language
|-
| Stokoe notation ||data-sort-value=Zzzz| || 1960 || William Stokoe ||data-sort-value=￮￮misc￮1960|Proposed featural system of writing sign languages
|-
|Tangut||Tang||1036||Yeli Renrong||data-sort-value=￮0natural￮3logographic￮1036|Logographic script historically used to write the extinct Tangut language
|-
| Tengwar || Teng || 1930s || J. R. R. Tolkien ||data-sort-value=￮1fiction￮0novel￮1910Tolkien￮1|Elven script used for various languages in his novel The Lord of the Rings
|-
|Testerian||data-sort-value=Zzzz| ||1529||Jacobo de Testera||data-sort-value=￮￮misc￮1529|Pictorial writing system used until the 19th century to teach Christian doctrine to the indigenous peoples of Mexico
|-
|Thai||Thai||1283||Ram Khamhaeng||data-sort-value=￮0natural￮1abugida￮1283|Abugida used to write Thai, Southern Thai and many others
|-
|Tibetan||Tibt||data-sort-value=0650|ca. 650||Thonmi Sambhota||data-sort-value=￮0natural￮1abugida￮0650|Abugida probably based on Gupta, a Brahmic script, for writing Tibetan
|-
| Unifon ||data-sort-value=Zzzz| ||data-sort-value=1955|mid-1950s || John R. Malone ||data-sort-value=￮0natural￮0alphabet￮￮English￮1955|Phonemic alphabet to write the English language, based on the Latin alphabet
|-
|Universal Alphabet||data-sort-value=Zzzz| ||1585||Thomas Harriot||data-sort-value=￮0natural￮0alphabet￮1585|Phonetic alphabet used to transcribe the extinct Carolina Algonquian language
|-
|Vai||Vaii||data-sort-value=1832|ca. 1832||Momolu Duwalu Bukele||data-sort-value=￮0natural￮2syllabary￮1832|Syllabary used to write the Vai language
|-
| Visible Speech || Visp || 1867 || Alexander Melville Bell ||data-sort-value=￮￮misc￮1867|System of phonetic symbols to represent the position of the speech organs
|-
|Warang||Wara||data-sort-value=1950|ca. 1950||Lako Bodra||data-sort-value=￮0natural￮1abugida￮1950|Abugida, but with alphabet-like full vowel symbols, to write the Ho language
|-
|Yugtun||data-sort-value=Zzzz| ||data-sort-value=1900|ca. 1900||Uyaquq||data-sort-value=￮0natural￮2syllabary￮1900|Syllabary historically used to write the Central Alaskan Yup'ik language
|-
|Zanabazar square||Zanb||data-sort-value=1685|pre-1686||Zanabazar||data-sort-value=￮0natural￮1abugida￮1686|Abugida based on a Brahmic script developed to write the Mongolian language
|-
|data-sort-value=zz|unnamed||data-sort-value=Zzzz| ||2019||Jon Ingold||data-sort-value=￮1fiction￮1game￮2019|The script used by the Ancients in the game Heaven's Vault
|-style=display:none
!colspan=4 rowspan=2 data-sort-value=ZZZZ| !!rowspan=2 data-sort-value=￮0natural|Natural language
|-style=display:none
!colspan=4 rowspan=2 data-sort-value=ZZZZ| !!rowspan=2 data-sort-value=￮0natural￮0alphabet style=font-weight:normal|Alphabet
|-style=display:none
!colspan=4 rowspan=2 data-sort-value=ZZZZ| !!rowspan=2 data-sort-value=￮0natural￮1abugida style=font-weight:normal|Abugida
|-style=display:none
!colspan=4 rowspan=2 data-sort-value=ZZZZ| !!rowspan=2 data-sort-value=￮0natural￮2syllabary style=font-weight:normal|Syllabary
|-style=display:none
!colspan=4 rowspan=2 data-sort-value=ZZZZ| !!rowspan=2 data-sort-value=￮0natural￮3logographic style=font-weight:normal|Logographic
|-style=display:none
!colspan=4 rowspan=2 data-sort-value=ZZZZ| !!rowspan=2 data-sort-value=￮1fiction|Fiction
|-style=display:none
!colspan=4 rowspan=2 data-sort-value=ZZZZ| !!rowspan=2 data-sort-value=￮￮misc|Miscellaneous
|-
|style=display:none|
|}
* Script in ongoing development.

See also
 Constructed script
 List of writing systems
 ConScript Unicode Registry

External links
 Constructed scripts and languages at omniglot.com

References

 
Constructed languages
Writing